Kim Jin-yeong (born 2 September 1970) is a South Korean former cyclist. She won a silver medal in the women's sprint event at the 1987 Asian Cycling Championships. She competed in the women's sprint event at the 1988 Summer Olympics. She was also part of the South Korean delegation at the 1990 Asian Games.

References

External links
 

1970 births
Living people
South Korean female cyclists
Olympic cyclists of South Korea
Cyclists at the 1988 Summer Olympics
Cyclists at the 1990 Asian Games
Place of birth missing (living people)
Asian Games competitors for South Korea
20th-century South Korean women
21st-century South Korean women